The Mile–Mengzi high-speed railway or Mimeng HSR is a high-speed railway line in Honghe, Yunnan, China. It is operated by China Railway Kunming Group. It is the first high-speed railway line which runs entirely in an autonomous prefecture in mainland China (PRC).

History 
Construction officially started on 30 May 2018. The railway opened on 16 December 2022.

Specification
The line splits from the Nanning–Kunming high-speed railway south of Mile railway station. It ends at Honghe railway station.

Stations

References

High-speed railway lines in China
Rail transport in Yunnan